Kolstad is a village with less than 50 inhabitants (2005) on the island Öland. It belongs to the municipality Borgholm.

Populated places in Borgholm Municipality